David Richter (born April 8, 1960) is a retired professional ice hockey player. Originally from Winnipeg in Canada, he played 365 NHL games with the Minnesota North Stars, Philadelphia Flyers, Vancouver Canucks, and St. Louis Blues. He was drafted by the North Stars in the 1980 NHL Entry Draft. In November 1985, Richter and teammate Bo Berglund were traded to the Philadelphia Flyers in exchange for Todd Bergen and Ed Hospodar.

Career statistics

References

External links
 

1960 births
Albany Choppers players
Baltimore Skipjacks players
Birmingham South Stars players
Canadian ice hockey defencemen
Capital District Islanders players
Living people
Michigan Wolverines men's ice hockey players
Minnesota North Stars draft picks
Minnesota North Stars players
Nashville South Stars players
Peoria Rivermen (IHL) players
Philadelphia Flyers players
Phoenix Roadrunners (IHL) players
St. Boniface Saints (ice hockey) players
St. Louis Blues players
Salt Lake Golden Eagles (CHL) players
Ice hockey people from Winnipeg
Springfield Indians players
Vancouver Canucks players
Wiener EV players
Canadian expatriate ice hockey players in Austria
Canadian expatriate ice hockey players in the United States